Willie Smith (12 May 1885 – 8 May 1964)  was an English cricketer who played first-class cricket for  Derbyshire in 1913.

Smith was born at Gringley-on-the-Hill, Nottinghamshire. He made his debut for Derbyshire in May 1913 against Lancashire when he made 8 and 2. His next and last game for the club was against Somerset, when he scored 1 and 2. Smith was a right-hand batsman and played 4 innings in 2 first-class matches with a total of 13 runs.

Smith died at Scawsby, Yorkshire at the age of 78.

References

1885 births
1964 deaths
Derbyshire cricketers
English cricketers
People from Gringley on the Hill
Cricketers from Nottinghamshire